The Heart of Jade is a novel by Spanish author Salvador de Madariaga, first published in 1942. It is widely regarded as an exceptional example of modern Spanish-language literature.

Plot summary
The book is a work of historical fiction set in the late pre-Columbian age in Mexico City and depicts the daily life of the ancient Aztec people, both the commoners (servants, traders and warriors) and the upper classes (priests, nobles, and government officials). The "Mexican" section contains a great deal of Mexican symbolism, geographical, political and religious references and historical data taken from various authors like Bernal Díaz del Castillo and his book Verdadera Historia de la Conquista de la Nueva España (in English, "True History of the Conquest of New Spain").

The novel also recounts the history and development of the Manriques, a family of Spanish nobles, and details aspects of life in 15th century Spain. The Manrique family lives through major historical events, such as the reconquest of Spain by Ferdinand II of Aragon and Isabella I of Castile, the expulsion of the Jews from Spain in 1492, the reception of Christopher Columbus twice at Torremala (the Family Settlement), news of the discovery of the Americas and the relationship between the family of Hernán Cortés and the Manriques.

The two stories eventually merge with the meeting of the two main characters, Alonso Manrique and Xuchitl (the daughter of King Nezahualpilli of Texcoco, one of the three allied kingdoms that Cortés found at the time of his arrival). As Cortés approaches the great city of Tenochtitlan, the Mexican natives line the city's main causeway. Xuchitl is among the gathered crowds, and sees Alonso Manrique there for the first time.  The Mexican set of characters struggles with love, pain, pride and hate with the Spanish group of characters during the conquest of Mexico (1519-1521) by Hernán Cortés, the fall and complete destruction of Tenochtitlan and its satellite kingdoms, and the emergence of a new nation, New Spain (now modern Mexico) out of the meeting of two great cultures: the Spanish heritage (with old Visigoth, Jewish, Moorish and Catholic roots) and the ancient native Mexican traditions (like the Olmecs, Mayans, and Toltecs).

The novel deals with the "conflict between two worlds": Christian Europe and Aztec America.  Both civilizations are represented by equally-committed proponents: Alonso Manrique (Europe) and Itzcauatzin (America). Both characters are soldiers and priests (symbolizing nationalism and faith). Alonso started as a priest and later became a warrior; Itzcauatzin entered an academy (Calmecac) that prepared him for both. Caught in between is Xuchitl, the Aztec princess.  Whoever wins her wins the future of the Aztec civilization. Xuchitl identifies the winner by giving him the Aztec talisman known as "el corazon de piedra verde" ("the green stone heart").  This talisman was worn by her father and represents the mystic powers of the Aztec religion. Alonso won, signifying the beginning of the Christianization of Mexico. Itzcauatzin gives his life as a human sacrifice vainly trying to add enough power to the traditional religion to overcome the Europeans. In the end, Alonso and Xuchitl have a son and return to Mexico from Spain. They bring the jade heart with them, but with the Virgin Mary etched on it to counteract the stone's original powers. The novel was the first of an intended five novels —each covering a century (16th to 20th)— tracking the creation of modern Mexico through the descendants of Alonso and Xuchitl. However, only four novels were finished before Salvador de Madariaga died.

1942 novels
20th-century Spanish novels
Historical novels
Aztecs in fiction
Novels set in Spain
Novels set in the 15th century
Novels set during the Conquest of the Americas
Novels set in pre-Columbian America
Mesoamerica in fiction
Novels set in Mexico City